Hydraecia immanis, the hop vine borer moth is a moth in the family Noctuidae native to North America. The species was described by Achille Guenée in 1852. It is listed as a species of special concern and is believed to be extirpated from the US state of Connecticut.

Food
It is a considered a root pest of several crops, including Zea mays (corn), and Humulus lupulus (common hop). It also feeds on Silphium species, and Lupinus microcarpus.

References

Apameini